Catching Milat is a two-part Australian television miniseries that screened on the Seven Network, in collaboration with Screen Australia on 17 and 24 May 2015. It is based on the 1998 book Sins of the Brother by Mark Whittaker and Les Kennedy and is loosely based upon the true story of how New South Wales Police and detectives under "Task Force Air" tracked down and caught serial killer Ivan Milat, who was responsible for the infamous backpacker murders.

Critical response
Clive Small, a former assistant police commissioner, retired detective and now author, served as the investigation team head of "Task Force Air". He has criticised the program as a marginally fictionalised account, especially for overstating the role of Detective Paul Gordon.

Main cast
 Richard Cawthorne as Detective Paul Gordon
 Geoff Morrell as Superintendent Clive Small
 Malcolm Kennard as Ivan Milat
 David Field as Detective Neil Birse
 Craig Hall as Detective Rodney Lynch
 Leeanna Walsman as Shirley Soires
 Sacha Horler as Karen Milat
 Carole Skinner as Margaret Milat
 Fletcher Humphrys as Richard Milat
 Linda Ngo as Therese
 Alex Williams as Paul Onions

Production
The series was produced by Shine Productions (as Shine Australia, a division of Shine Group), for Network Seven and directed by Peter Andrikidis and produced by Kerrie Mainwaring and Rory Callaghan in the pine forests of south-western Australia. It was written by Dalton Dartmouth.

Reception 
The first episode aired on 17 May 2015 at 8:50 on the Seven Network.

Home Media
Catching Milat was Released on DVD and Blu-ray on 25 May 2015 with no bonus content, but the two part series episodes on the DVD run longer than the original aired episodes.

References

External links
 

2010s Australian television miniseries
2015 Australian television series debuts
2015 Australian television series endings
Seven Network original programming